Alocasia nebula is a species of flowering plant in the family Araceae, native to Sarawak state, Malaysia. As a houseplant it is said to be the most difficult Alocasia to grow.

References

nebula
House plants
Endemic flora of Borneo
Flora of Sarawak
Plants described in 2000